Mossgiel can refer to:

Mossgiel Farm, Ayrshire, Scotland - home of poet Robert Burns
Mossgiel, New South Wales, named after Burns's farm

See also
Mosgiel, New Zealand - also named for Burns's farm